Commerce Place is a high-rise in Baltimore, Maryland. The structure was completed in 1992. Commerce Place's project architect and lead designer was architect Geraldine Pontius of RTKL Associates, a Baltimore-based architectural and engineering firm; the structure is an example of Postmodern architecture. 23 of the building's 31 floors are used for commercial offices, while six are used for parking. The remaining two floors are used as retail space.

See also
 List of tallest buildings in Baltimore

References

Downtown Baltimore
Office buildings completed in 1992
Postmodern architecture in Maryland
Skyscraper office buildings in Baltimore
1992 establishments in Maryland